Usman Arshad (born 9 January 1993) is an English cricketer who played for Durham and Leicestershire County Cricket Clubs. He is a right-arm medium-fast bowler who also bats right-handed. He made his first-class debut for the county in August 2013 against Surrey.

References

External links
 

1993 births
Living people
English cricketers
Durham cricketers
Cricketers from Bradford
Northumberland cricketers
British Asian cricketers
Leicestershire cricketers
Lincolnshire cricketers